Pabstiella bacillaris is a species of orchid plant native to Brazil .

References 

bacillaris
Flora of Brazil
Plants described in 2007